Dabbu (Real name: Prasenjit Ghosal) Music composer based on Mumbai .. known as ‘’DABBU” in the national music scene..
He workes as a music composer in Mumbai and Kolkata. He has closely worked with the best films productions like Svf and composed several Bengali (Regional) Films songs which has been sung by Arijit Singh, Armaan malik, Papon, Anupam Roy, Shaan & many more..

Performance 
Played GUITAR & performed with well acclaimed projects all over the world like ‘’This is not fusion’’ which witnessed audience in Frankfurt Book Fest, Lille Fest and Bozar Fest in Brussels in 2006.
Performed at British Museum, Johannesburg in 2011 for WITS university and even shared stage with famous vocalists like Shreya Ghoshal and Gary Lawyer touring all over the world.
Apart from playing for the renowned band like Hip Pocket, also accompanied by famous Jazz Musicians like Louis Bankz at renowned venues like Blue Frog, Jazz By the Bay, Hard Rock Cafe...

Career 
Dabbu born in kolkata started his career as a Guitar player ,He played guitar for many Bollywood & Bengali Film & Non Film Songs & Ad commercials.He started his music direction career with film production Shree Venkatesh Films| in Kolkata. He moved to Mumbai on 2009 .

Filmography

References

 7.https://timesofindia.indiatimes.com/videos/entertainment/music/bengali/check-out-new-bengali-trending-lyrical-song-music-video-toke-niye-sung-by-santanu-dey-sarkar/videoshow/85234669.cms?from=mdr
 8.https://timesofindia.indiatimes.com/entertainment/bengali/movies/news/saptaswa-reveals-how-jatugrihos-music-is-shaping-up/articleshow/83303833.cms?s=08&from=mdr

External links

1979 births
Music directors
Bengali Hindus
Musicians from Kolkata
Indian film score composers
Indian guitarists
Living people
Bengali film score composers
21st-century guitarists